Under the Skin is a 1994 Australian anthology television series. It consisted of twelve half-hour dramas, each reflecting different aspects of Australian cultural and regional diversity.

Under the Skin was awarded Best Mini-Series or Telefeature at the 1994 Australian Film Institute Awards, for the episode "The Long Ride".

Episodes

References

External links

1994 Australian television series debuts
1994 Australian television series endings
Special Broadcasting Service original programming
English-language television shows
Television shows set in Australia
Australian anthology television series